Street of Fury is a 1996 Hong Kong crime film directed by Billy Tang and starring Louis Koo, Michael Tse, Gigi Lai, Teresa Mak and Jerry Lamb.

Plot 
The movie is about a few teenagers, Hu and Yu-long, continuously falling victim to the local gang and their leader.

After Hu's girlfriend gets raped by a few of the gang members, he joins the rivaling gang whose leader is Boss King, a psychopath and extremely cruel thug.

Quickly Hu climbs the authority chain as he starts cutting off the hands of his opponent which being the Top-Level rivaling thugs. While Yi is still recovering, Hu continuously mistreats her which leads to an intimate relationship between Yi and Hu's gang leader while Yu-long slowly gets closer to the more older lady Shan.

Cast
Louis Koo as Lung
Michael Tse as Fu
Gigi Lai as Yee
Teresa Mak as Shan
Jerry Lamb as Siu-cheung
Simon Lui as "Short Sighted"
Elvis Tsui as Chuen Wong
Alan Chui Chung-San as Kwong Yan-fai
Ben Lam as Kam Sau
Wong Yat-fei as Fu's uncle
Lo Fan as Fu's aunt
Raven Choi as Gang member
So Wai-nam
Chow Mei-shing
Mei Yee as Mahjong player
Chan Po-chun as Brother Chun Chi
Kong Foo-keung as Thug
Anthony Carpio as Thug
Hong Ping as Thug
Jackson Ng as Fai's thug
Sun Poon-chung as Assassin

Production
Teresa Mak shaved her head for her role in the film.

References

External links

1996 films
1996 crime films
Hong Kong crime films
Triad films
1990s Cantonese-language films
Films directed by Billy Tang
Films set in Hong Kong
Films shot in Hong Kong
1990s Hong Kong films